NCAA March Madness 08 is the 2007 installment in the NCAA March Madness series. Former University of Texas and current Phoenix Suns forward Kevin Durant is featured on the cover. It was the only March Madness game available for the PlayStation 3 until the name change.

Features
 New "Dynamic Post Control". 
 New recruiting system modeled after NCAA Football 08. Players are searchable by position, type, and size.
 The new "EA Sports Lockdown Stick" enables players to pressure the ball, force turnovers and harass opponents on the court.
 Dynasty mode enhancements include the pre and post season NIT and the McDonald's High School All American game.
 More authentic arenas.
 New player models with form-fitting uniforms.
 Breakaway basketball hoop rims.
 Custom playbooks.
 ESPN on Demand.

Reception

The game received "mixed or average reviews" on all platforms according to the review aggregation website Metacritic.

See also
NBA Live 08

References

External links
 

2007 video games
Basketball video games
EA Sports games
NCAA video games
North America-exclusive video games
PlayStation 2 games
PlayStation 3 games
Video games developed in Canada
Xbox 360 games